Clarksville Airport may refer to:

 Clarksville Municipal Airport, serving Clarksville, Arkansas, United States
 Clarksville-Montgomery County Regional Airport (Outlaw Field), serving Clarksville, Tennessee, United States
 Clarksville/Red River County Airport (Trissell Field), serving Clarksville, Texas, United States